Jens Podevijn (born 18 July 1989 in Aalst) is a Belgian professional footballer who plays as a striker and who plays for FCV Dender EH. He formerly played for Eendracht Aalst and Willem II.

External links
 Voetbal International profile
 Jens Podevijn at Soccerway

1989 births
Living people
Belgian footballers
Belgian expatriate footballers
S.C. Eendracht Aalst players
Willem II (football club) players
Challenger Pro League players
Eredivisie players
Eerste Divisie players
Expatriate footballers in the Netherlands
Sportspeople from Aalst, Belgium
Footballers from East Flanders

Association football forwards